Eusideroxylon zwageri is a rare timber tree native to the Brunei, Indonesia, Malaysia and Philippines region. It is known colloquially in English as Bornean ironwood, billian, or ulin.

Distribution
It is native to Brunei; Flores, Java, Kalimantan and Sumatra in Indonesia; the Sabah and Sarawak states of Malaysia; and the Sulu Archipelago of the Philippines. It is threatened by habitat loss. The government of Indonesia and the state government of Sarawak have formally banned the export of this species. Illegal smuggling continues to be a major problem.

Eusideroxylon zwageri grows in lowland primary and secondary forest up to 625m altitude. It prefers well-drained soils, sandy to clay-loam, sometimes limestone. It is commonly found along rivers and adjacent hills. It requires an average annual rainfall of 2,500–4,000 mm. It occurs scattered or in groups.

This very important tree is one of the most durable and heaviest timbers in the world. It is now threatened by over-exploitation, lack of regeneration and difficulties in cultivation.

Description
Eusideroxylon zwageri is a slow growing (0.5 metres per year) tall evergreen tree with a straight bole (usually host to Cassytha, a parasitic vine with leaves reduced to scales, up to half of the tree's height). It is slightly fluted at the base, up to 150–220 cm in diameter. The trunk has many small, rounded buttresses that give the base an elephant-foot like appearance. Individual trees may reach an age of 1,000 years or more. Common commercially exploitable trees attain a height of 30 or more metres (100 ft) with trunk diameters of exploitable trees up to 92 cm (36 inches). Protected trees are towering giants of the forest attaining a height of up to 50 metres and a diameter of 220 cm – though height is routinely reduced by lightning strikes. An Ulin tree discovered in 1993 in Kutai National Park, is one of the largest plants in Indonesia. It is an estimated 1,000 years old, and has increased its diameter from 2.41 to 2.47 metres in the 20 years since its discovery. Its height was however reduced from some 30 metres to only 20 after a lightning strike. Another at Sangkimah in the west of the park has a diameter of 2.25 metres and a height of some 45 metres.

The trees' leaves are dark green, simple, leathery, elliptical to ovate, 14–18 cm long (5.5–7.5 inches) and 5–11 cm wide (2–4 inches), and are alternate, rarely whorled or opposite, without stipules and petiolate. The leaf blade is entire (unlobed or lobed in Sassafras) and occasionally with domatia (crevices or hollows serving as lodging for mites) in axils of main lateral veins (present in Cinnamomum).

The inflorescences which are in the axils of leaves or deciduous bracts, include panicles (rarely heads), racemes, compound cymes, or pseudoumbels (spikes in Cassytha), and are sometimes enclosed by decussate bracts.
The flowers are bisexual only or staminate and bisexual on some plants, pistillate and bisexual on others. The flowers are usually yellow to greenish or white, rarely reddish. The hypanthium are well-developed, resembling calyx tube tepals and the stamens perigynous. The tepals are in groups of 6 to 9, in 2 or 3 whorls of 3 and sepaloid. If tepals are unequal will then usually possess 3 outer smaller rather than inner 3. This is occasionally absent in Litsea. The stamens are in multiples and whorls of 3, but 1 or more whorls are frequently staminodial or absent. The stamens of the third whorl has 2 glands near its base. These are 2–4 locular, with locules opening by valves.

There is one pistil and one carpel. There is a one locular ovary with a basal placentation; one ovule; a subsessile stigma, which is discoid or capitate. The fruit are drupes, a drupe borne on a pedicel with or without persistent tepals at its base, or is seated in a deeply cup-shaped receptacle (cupule), or is enclosed in an accrescent floral tube. The fruit contains one seed without an endosperm. The fruit are poisonous to humans but have medicinal properties.

The parasite vine, Cassytha is sometimes placed in its own family, Cassythaceae.

Habitat
Eusideroxylon zwageri seedlings require some shade, while older trees need plenty of light. It can be found in valleys and on hillsides and even on low ridges when soil moisture is sufficient at elevations between sea level and 625 m. The standing timber volume of trees with a diameter of over 50 cm may be as much as 90–112 m3.

Silviculture
Eusideroxylon zwageri has a very slow growth rate of mean radial growth of 0.058 cm per year. It is a canopy species in primary forests. The species is considered unsuitable for large-scale plantations due to slow growth and inadequate seed and seedling supply. Manual selection of trees in natural forests is common.

Properties
The heartwood when cut is coloured light brown to almost bright yellow. During the aging process the heartwood darkens to deep reddish brown, very dark brown or almost black. The sapwood is bright yellow when cut, and darkens slightly. The wood texture is fine and even, with a straight grain or only slightly interlocked. The timber retains a pleasant lemon odour. This odour, along with the woods' natural high lustre, make it prized by cabinet-makers and fine furniture craftsmen.

The wood is dense, and texture is moderately fine to fine and even. Also attractive to users is the resistance to insects, bacteria, fungi and marine borers. The wood has anti-bacterial properties (for local medicinal use)
Vessels are diffuse-porous, medium-sized and generally evenly distributed, arranged in short radial rows (2–3 vessels). Moderate abundancy of aliform paratracheal parenchyma. Growth rings boundaries are indistinct or absent. Tyloses are often present.

The wood has a radial shrinkage rate of 2–4.5% and a tangential shrinkage rate of tangential 4.5–7.5%.  The timber dries slowly, and care is needed to avoid checks and splits. The wood is famed for its easy working characteristics, despite high density. The wood planes, bores and turns cleanly, producing smooth and often lustrous surfaces. Nailing requires pre-bores prior to nailing. Saw blades and cutting instruments are only moderate blunted during working the timber. Apparently, the wood is difficult to glue with synthetic resins.

Heartwood is rated as very durable – immune to termite attack; service life of up to 100 years in direct soil contact and more than 20 years for marine work in tropical waters has been reported.

Usage
Due to the excellent resistance to bacterial, fungal, insect and marine borer  attack the wood is highly prized for many outdoor uses, especially as decking. Additionally, the wood's high density and easy workability lend it to particularly desirability in maritime structures, dock construction and ship building, especially Indonesia's pinisi sail-boat.
Common local uses include:  House construction, door construction, water butts and troughs, boat building (Pinisi), tools, tool handles, talisman, jewellery, medicinal slivers (for wounds, cuts, abrasions, bites and tooth-ache/infection), bridges, blowpipes and spear shafts.

Internationally, it is renowned for heavy construction such as a buffer between transportation trailers and heavy steel fabrications (such as boilers, pressure vessels, reactors and many others). It is also frequently found in dry docks as a timber to separate the hull of ships from the steel supporting stands. Other uses include  use in boats and ships, industrial flooring, roofing (as shingles), fine indoor and outdoor furniture, coffin wood (esteemed by Chinese due to ability to withstand rot and insect attack) and tool handles (especially those exposed to continual high impact (the wood does not splinter and thus injure hands, eyes or endanger the operator on catastrophic failure) such as shovels, axes, block splitters, sledge hammers, heavy mallets, demolition hammers, mattocks, picks, hoes and hammers). Some expert cabinet-makers treasure an ulin-headed carpenter's mallet as an excellent intermediate density hammer face between the usual wood and a metal one and is able to quite easily tap or "whack" stubborn highly polished metal fixtures without damage to the face or the fixture.

Other sources indicate that ulin wood is often used for marine constructions such as pilings, wharfs, docks, sluices, dams, ships, bridges, but also used for power line poles, masts, roof shingles and house posts and to a minor extent as frame, board, heavy duty flooring, railway sleepers, fencing material, furniture etc.

Endangered status
The decline of this species which was first noted in 1955. Browne (1955) stated: "Our surviving supplies of Belian are by no means very large and undoubtedly dwindling."
Population reduction has been noted in the following regions: Kalimantan, Sumatra, Sabah, Sarawak, and the Philippines.
IUCN has categorized it Vulnerable A1cd and A2cd. CITES listed II Bi (unsustainable level of exploitation from the wild for international trade). Regeneration in logged-over forests is limited.

The species is threatened by over-exploitation, predominantly by illegal migrant loggers. Current demand for the timber is fueled for its esteem among Chinese as a coffin wood (as it is resistant to insect and rot). Included in list of vanishing timber species of the Philippines and considered almost extinct in Sabah. In Java and Sumatra it exists solely in National Parks.  Currently the situation is assessed as a serious depletion of stands.
The species is only planted on a small scale because the supply of seeds and seedlings is inadequate. The IPB Bogor Agricultural Institute (Institut Pertanian Bogor) is currently breeding a generation of plants more hardy than the wild harvested seeds

Trade
Indonesia has a total prohibition on export, and cutting is restricted to trees less than 60 cm diameter measured at breast height. In Sarawak, export in any form is not allowed without special permission. Sabah still allows export.

Indigenous beliefs
Many Dayak believe that the ulin wood acts as a protective talisman to avoid attack from tigers and elephants. The Dayak believe that this use of the ulin talisman and the stands of ulin trees was and is the sole cause of a lack of Sumatran elephants or Sumatran tigers in Kalimantan and Sarawak.  The potent 'elephant and tiger repellent' is alleged to be the sap of the tree, which has a strong, pleasant lemon-like odour.

See also 
 Illegal logging

References

External links

 Asian Forest Network
 CITES website
 Indonesian Department of Forestry: Department Perhutanan: (English available onsite)
  at the IUCN Red List
 UN FAO
 UN EP
 Manikay
 Plant Science Images image database

Lauraceae
Trees of Malesia
Vulnerable plants
Taxonomy articles created by Polbot